William Cleary may refer to:

William E. Cleary (1849–1932), U.S. Representative from New York
William J. Cleary (1870–1952), American politician
William Castle Cleary (1886–1971), British civil servant
Bill Cleary (Australian footballer) (1868–1942), Australian rules footballer
Bill Cleary (footballer, born 1931) (1921–1991), English soccer player
Bill Cleary (ice hockey) (born 1934), American ice hockey player and coach
Bill Cleary (Irish footballer), Irish soccer player